Pramod Kumar is an Indian politician belonging to the Bharatiya Janata Party (BJP) who currently serves as the Minister of Sugarcane Industries and Minister of Law in the Government of Bihar. He has been the member of Bihar Legislative Assembly since 2005 representing Motihari (Vidhan Sabha constituency).

References 

Living people
People from East Champaran district
Bharatiya Janata Party politicians from Bihar
Bihar MLAs 2015–2020
1962 births